Figure skating at the 2019 Winter Universiade was held on March 7-9 at the Platinum Arena in Krasnoyarsk, Russia. Medals were awarded in men's singles, ladies' singles, pairs, ice dancing, and synchronized skating.

Regulations
Skaters who were born between 1 January 1994 and 31 December 2001 are eligible to compete at the Winter Universiade if they are registered as proceeding towards a degree or diploma at a university or similar institute, or obtained their academic degree or diploma in the year preceding the event.

In pairs and ice dance, only one partner must be a citizen of the country for which they are competing. Each nation may send a maximum of three entries per discipline, except synchronized skating for which the maximum is two teams.

Medalists

Medal table

Entries

Changes to preliminary assignments

Results

Men

Ladies

Pairs
 Alexandra Koshevaya / Dmitry Bushlanov were disqualified for Koshevaya's violation of anti-doping rules.

Ice dance

Synchronized

References

External links
 2019 Winter Universiade at the International Skating Union
Results Book – Figure Skating

Figure skating
2019
2019 Winter Universiade
Winter Universiade